Mihăileni is a commune in Botoșani County, Romania. It is composed of three villages: Mihăileni, Pârâu Negru and Rogojești, with a total population of 2,283 as of 2011.

Rogojești and the former village of Sinăuții de Jos (now part of Mihăileni) are located in Bukovina, while the rest of Mihăileni and Pârâu Negru are in Western Moldavia.

At the 2011 census, 83.4% of inhabitants were Romanians and 14.3% Ukrainians. At the 2002 census, 89% were Romanian Orthodox and 8.7% Pentecostal.

Natives
 Ury Benador
 Idov Cohen
 Leo Goldhammer
 Petru Manoliu
 Ion Păun-Pincio

References

Communes in Botoșani County
Localities in Western Moldavia
Shtetls